Alfred Kelbassa (21 April 1925 – 11 August 1988) was a German football player.

Kelbassa played for Preußen Münster (1952–1953) and Borussia Dortmund (1954–1963).

He played for West Germany 6 times, scoring two goals, and was a participant at the 1958 FIFA World Cup.

Honours

Club
Borussia Dortmund
 German football championship (3): 1956, 1957, 1963

References 

1925 births
1988 deaths
German footballers
Germany international footballers
Borussia Dortmund players
1958 FIFA World Cup players
Sportspeople from Gelsenkirchen
Association football midfielders
Footballers from North Rhine-Westphalia
STV Horst-Emscher players
SC Preußen Münster players